Józef Wojciechowski (born 17 January 1947) is a Polish developer, owner of J.W. Construction Holding S.A., and former owner of Polonia Warsaw football club. He was the 31st richest Pole as of 2013, with his wealth was estimated at 950 million zlotys, or about 300 million dollars.

References

External links
 Urszula Szyperska, JW: Józef Wojciechowski zbudował sobie fortunę, Polityka, 6 April 2007

Polish businesspeople
Living people
1947 births